John Harwood (born November 5, 1956) is an American journalist who worked as White House Correspondent for CNN from February 2021 until September 2022.   Harwood was formerly an editor-at-large for CNBC. He was the chief Washington Correspondent for CNBC and a contributor for The New York Times. He wrote a weekly column entitled "The Caucus" that appeared on Monday about Washington politics and policy. Before joining the Times, he wrote for The Wall Street Journal.

Early life and education

Harwood's father, Richard Harwood, was a reporter and writer for The Louisville Times and The Washington Post.  According to John Harwood's article in The Washington Post (April 30, 2000, page B4), Harwood's mother was an active campaigner for the presidential campaign of Robert F. Kennedy in 1968. Harwood, at age 11, appeared in a television ad for Kennedy's 1968 campaign.

Harwood graduated from Bethesda-Chevy Chase High School, where he edited the school newspaper, The Tattler. (Harwood was the commencement speaker for the high school's graduating class of 2010.) While in high school, Harwood served as a copy boy for the Washington Star, his first journalism job.

Harwood attended Duke University, studying history and economics there. He graduated magna cum laude in 1978.

Journalism career

After graduating from college, Harwood joined the St. Petersburg Times in Florida, working in Tampa Bay, Tallahassee, and Washington. He traveled to South Africa, covering developments in the final years of apartheid. He was a Nieman Fellow at Harvard University from 1989 to 1990.

Harwood became the White House correspondent for the Wall Street Journal in 1991, covering the George H. W. Bush administration.  He subsequently became a Capitol Hill correspondent and, in 1997, political editor and chief political correspondent for the newspaper. Harwood became chief Washington correspondent for CNBC in March 2006.

Harwood frequently appears on Washington Week, a public affairs program on PBS formerly hosted by Gwen Ifill, as well as NBC's Meet the Press, and MSNBC's Morning Joe. He and co-author Gerald Seib were Tim Russert's guests in Russert's last taped interview for Russert's MSNBC eponymous interview program, which was to air the weekend of June 14, 2008, just hours before Russert's death.

Harwood was a moderator for CNBC's Republican primary presidential debate on October 28, 2015. Harwood was criticized by both the debate candidates, the media and his own CNBC colleagues for his performance as moderator. 

Harwood saw further criticism after the personal email account of John Podesta, who was then chairman of the 2016 Hillary Clinton presidential campaign, was hacked and had its contents published by the website WikiLeaks in October and November 2016. Among the emails were several from Harwood that some critics said indicated an unprofessional level of closeness or collusion between the two, including an email from May 2015 in which Harwood warned Podesta that then-candidate Ben Carson could represent "real trouble" to the Clinton campaign. The emails also revealed that Harwood had asked Podesta which questions he should ask Republican candidate Jeb Bush during a debate.

Harwood drew scrutiny from conservative critics on February 6, 2020 when he claimed that President Donald Trump was in "deep psychological distress" following his press conference after the U.S. Senate voted to acquit him on both articles of impeachment. On 2 September 2022, Harwood announced his departure from CNN via Twitter which many sources believe was unplanned, and a result of his disagreement with the network's new owners attempt to shift the network to the right.

References

External links

 
 
 Interview with Scott Walker, cnbc.com, September 2015; accessed November 20, 2016.

1956 births
Living people
American newspaper reporters and correspondents
American television reporters and correspondents
American broadcast news analysts
The Wall Street Journal people
The New York Times writers
Duke University Trinity College of Arts and Sciences alumni
People from Silver Spring, Maryland
Television personalities from Louisville, Kentucky
Writers from Louisville, Kentucky
Bethesda-Chevy Chase High School alumni
CNBC people
Nieman Fellows
Journalists from Kentucky
American male journalists